The NIMPLY gate is a digital logic gate that implements a material nonimplication.

Symbols

A right-facing arrow with a line through it can be used to denote NIMPLY in algebraic expressions. Logically, it is equivalent to material nonimplication, and the logical expression A ∧ ¬B.

Usage
The NIMPLY gate is often used in synthetic biology and genetic circuits.

See also
IMPLY gate
AND gate
NOT gate
NAND gate
NOR gate
XOR gate
XNOR gate
Boolean algebra (logic)
Logic gates

References

Logic gates